The Utah State University Museum of Anthropology is a small museum located in the Old Main building on Utah State University's main campus in Logan, Utah, United States.

History
Begun in the 1960s with a single professor's personal collection of artifacts, the museum took up house in the Old Main building in 1984, first in the basement. It moved upstairs to its present location, in the south turret , in 1992.
 
While in 2010, university officials announced a plan to relocate the museum from its current room to its own building, those plans were eventually scrapped and the space in the Welcome Center on campus reallocated.

Mission and research
The museum has a mission of educating the local public on the fields of anthropology and museum studies. It also serves as a training and research ground for the USU Department of Anthropology. Students may hold internships at the museum and work toward a Museum Studies certificate.

The museum is also home to the popular "Saturdays at the Museum", wherein free family-centered  lectures and hands-on activities are held each Saturday throughout the year.

References

External links
USU Museum of Anthropology official site

Utah State University
University museums in Utah
Museums established in 1984
Museums in Cache County, Utah
Anthropology museums in the United States
History museums in Utah
1984 establishments in Utah